New Plymouth Observatory was opened in 1920 and is situated on Marsland Hill, Robe Street, New Plymouth, New Zealand, and is the home of the New Plymouth Astronomical Society (NPAS).

The Society opens the Observatory to the Public, Tuesday evenings. Winter hours are 7.30-9.00pm. Summer hours are 8.30-10.00pm. Group bookings by arrangement.   www.facebook.com/npobservatory/

Astronomical observatories in New Zealand
1920s architecture in New Zealand